Joseph Vendryes or Vendryès (13 January 1875, Paris – 30 January 1960) was a French Celtic linguist. After studying with Antoine Meillet, he was chairman of Celtic languages and literature at the École Pratique des Hautes Études. He founded the journal Études Celtiques. He was a member of the Académie des Inscriptions et Belles-Lettres and a consultant with the International Auxiliary Language Association, which standardized and presented Interlingua.

He studied the phenomenon of dislocation.

Quote
Le Language [...] est un acte physiologique en ce qu'il met en œuvre plusieurs organes du corps humain. C'est un acte psychologique en ce qu'il suppose l'activité volontaire de l'esprit. C'est un acte social en ce qu'il répond à un besoin de communication entre les hommes. Enfin, c'est un fait historique, attesté sous des formes très variées...
[Language is a physiological act since it uses many organs of the human body. It is a psychological act since it supposes the willing activity of the spirit. It is a social act since it fulfils a need for communication between men. Lastly it is a historical fact, attested under various forms...] — Le Langage, introduction linguistique à l'histoire (1921)

Published works
Recherches sur l'histoire et les effets de l'intensité initiale en latin (1902)
Traité d'accentuation grecque (1904)
Grammaire du vieil-irlandais (1908)
Le langage (1921)
La position linguistique du celtique (1930)
 La Religion des Celtes (1948)
Choix d'études linguistiques et celtiques. Paris: Klincksieck, 1952.
Lexique étymologique de l'irlandais ancien (1959)

See also
 Leo Weisgerber
 Jan de Vries

References

External links
 Observations on the English Translation of Vendryes' Le Langage

1875 births
1960 deaths
Celtic studies scholars
Indo-Europeanists
Linguists from France
Etymologists
Members of the Académie des Inscriptions et Belles-Lettres